Lee Seung-hoon (born January 11, 1992), also known by the mononym Hoony, is a South Korean rapper, dancer and choreographer. His musical career began in 2011 as a contestant in the first installation of K-pop Star (2011–2012) where he caught the attention of YG Entertainment CEO Yang Hyun-suk – who later signed him under his agency. Lee debuted with Winner after the band competed and were titled as the victors of WIN: Who is Next (2013) on August 17, 2014.

Life and career

1992–2010: Early life 
Lee Seung-hoon was born on January 11, 1992, in Dongnae District, Busan, South Korea, as the youngest succeeding two daughters. His father's absence in Lee's childhood was prominent due to his occupation as a businessman based in Vietnam. His eldest sister had also moved to Seoul when he was a child. Lee pursued dance at a young age and became adamant to join YG Entertainment since his enrollment in high school; however, his interest in dance resulted in severe back pains and restricted Lee to choreograph when it occurred. Lee relied on acupuncture as treatment for his nerves along his spine that suffered from irritation.

2011–2021: Career beginnings and debut with Winner 

20-year-old Lee (Korean age) moved to Seoul after he completed his secondary education as an attempt to enter the music industry. His motivation heightened after he witnessed Hoya of Infinite, a fellow peer in dance from his hometown, accomplish his dreams. Lee then formed the dance team "Honest Boys" (바른아이들; baleun aideul) with friends from Busan and showcased their performances on the streets of Seoul. The trio auditioned for the first installation of Korea's Got Talent (2011); however, his team was soon eliminated from the talent show posterior to their advancement from the preliminaries. He had also auditioned for entertainment companies but did not succeed. Lee joined a choreography team in which he became their team leader and created a dance routine for G-Dragon of Big Bang and his flash mob performance for Bean Pole and their campaign in 2011.

In his final attempt at pursuing his goal, Lee successfully auditioned for the inaugural season of K-pop Star (2011–2012), a music audition program. He received attention for renting a four pyeong (13.22 square metre) room one minute away from YG Entertainment, home to his favorite artists. His creativity and wittiness also stood out to many – displayed in the cover performance of Dynamic Duo's "Father" (아버지; abeoji). The hip-hop duo credited Lee for his contribution in ushering more attention to their songs than its initial success bringing in more profit. Namely, G-Dragon and Psy expressed their interest and added they were watching him and his stage. BoA voiced her desire to work with him while JYP Entertainment CEO Park Jin-young stated Lee was the only contestant he viewed as a "true artist". Moreover, K.Will noted his stages were the most inspirational apropos of it. He overall placed fourth behind Park Jimin, Lee Hi and Baek A-yeon. His newfound rise followed an appearance on Strong Heart, performance at Youth Festival in Seoul and photographed for a spread entitled "Boys Like Girls" in Vogue Girl Korea for the month of June with K-pop Star contestant Jae Park. He and Lee Hi signed an exclusive contract with YG Entertainment and was situated into its trainee system in May.

On February 25, 2013, YG Entertainment CEO Yang Hyun-suk stated Lee would shine best in a boy band contrary to as a soloist thus his preparation for debut in their upcoming team; however, he participated as a contestant for WIN: Who is Next? (2013) which involved two assembles consisting of male trainees under the label (A and B) who would battle for the chance to debut by series end after embarking on a one-hundred day journey. Lee was placed in "Team A" with Kim Jin-woo, Song Min-ho, Kang Seung-yoon and Nam Tae-hyun. In the series finale, Team A had won the show and would debut under the name "Winner". Lee made his official debut with the five-piece band on August 17, 2014, with the studio album entitled 2014 S/S. The band's success upon debut was recorded as "unprecedented" by Korean media outlets and were dubbed as "monster rookies".

Amidst his activities with the band, Lee ventured into entertainment in which his credits include Eat, Sleep, Eat: Krabi (2016) with Baek Jong-won and Gong Seung-yeon, Mimi Shop (2018) with the inclusion of labelmate Sandara Park, and Law of the Jungle in Mexico (2018). He also served as the youngest dance mentor in Dancing High (2018) and enriched the knowledge of teens in South Korea by assisting them to thrive as dancers as they competed in teams in prospect of winning dance lessons in the United States. His credits further extends to Awesome Feed (2018), Door-to-Door Salesmen (2020) on YouTube, and I Want to Be a Celebrity (2022).

2022–present: Solo activities and Youtube 
On October 17, 2022, Lee launched his personal YouTube channel "This Seunghoon, That Seunghoon" and uploaded his first video to reach out to his fans and "address the gap between human Lee Seunghoon and idol Lee Seunghoon" and "reveal absolutely everything".

On February 28, 2023, it was announced that Lee was confirmed to be cast in the stage musical Dream High as the one of the lead character roles, Song Sam-Dong, along with actor Eum Moon-suk and SF9 member Yoo Taeyang. This musical is based on a 2011 KBS2 drama of the same name.

Personal life 
On basis of his mandatory military service, Lee enlisted on April 16, 2020, and served his training at the Nonsan Army Training Center for four weeks prior to fulfilling his military duty as a public service worker. Lee was discharged from his duties on January 14, 2022, after he completed one year and seven months of his enlistment.

Artistry

Choreography and dance style 
As a dancer, Lee's style is considered more relaxed compared to the usual vigorous movements found in most idols, as he puts more detailed elements in his choreography with accordance to its lyrics or sound. He is also viewed as a versatile dancer and choreographer due to his ability in executing various genres in his dance routine. Lee has often been cited as an "idea bank" and "genius choreographer" in which his stages encompassed creativity and uniqueness. 1Million Dance Studio CEO and choreographer Lia Kim expressed Lee knew many dancing techniques given the long period of time he has been dancing for. Kwon Young-deuk of YGX stated Lee fully immerses himself and "feels" the dance and also learns choreography the fastest in YG Entertainment.

For Winner, Lee has choreographed their debut lead singles "Empty" (공허해; gongheohae) and "Color Ring" from 2014 S/S and "Fool" from Fate Number For – which he created and finalized within five hours.

Other ventures

Fashion 

In September 2017, Lee and his bandmate Mino were chosen as the influencers most suited in becoming ambassadors of the luxury brand, Burberry, appointed by its previous creative officer Christopher Bailey as they exhibited a "Viktor Horsting & Rolf Snoeren-like approach to haute couture". Both were labelled as winning front row looks and acquired advance access to the Burberry Spring 2018 collection two days after they landed at Heathrow Airport in London. In the fashion event, the London-based modelling agency AMCK Models' director and head scout, Patrick Egbon-Marshall gave Lee the sobriquet "Red King" and showed interest to scout him as a model to the agency.

Philanthropy 
Within his publicized acts, Lee and his fans accomplished 2,220 kg of rice wreaths for the press conference of Dancing High (2018) of which the fans supplied 500 kg of its total. Lee chose to distribute the rice to elderies of low-income who lived alone and to the disabled. He is also recognized as a regular donator alongside YG Entertainment and his fans for Korea Animal Rights Advocates (KARA).

Discography

Other charted songs

Production credits 
All song credits are adapted from the Korea Music Copyright Association's database, unless otherwise noted.

Solo work

Work as Winner

Other artists

Filmography

Television shows

Web shows

Music video appearances

Radio

Theater

Awards and nominations

Notes

References

External links 
 Seung-hoon Naver Cafe 
 

YG Entertainment artists
1992 births
Living people
South Korean male idols
K-pop Star participants
Musicians from Busan
South Korean male rappers
South Korean male singers
South Korean pop singers
South Korean hip hop dancers
Winner (band) members
21st-century South Korean singers